The Great Western Schoolhouse was built in 1870 along the then-developing National Road, west of St. Clairsville, Ohio. The schoolhouse is a traditional one room schoolhouse and was used until 1952. The building is currently used as a museum highlighting early education in southeastern Ohio and is open by appointment.

References

External links
 Great Western Schoolhouse - Belmont County attractions in St. Clairsville
 Discover Ohio - visiting information

Buildings and structures in Belmont County, Ohio
National Register of Historic Places in Belmont County, Ohio
School buildings on the National Register of Historic Places in Ohio
School buildings completed in 1870
Museums in Belmont County, Ohio
Education museums in the United States